Vntana (stylized as VNTANA) is an American social augmented reality company.

History
In 2012 the company was founded in Los Angeles by Ashley Crowder (the company’s CEO) and Ben Conway (the company’s COO). The company’s name is derived from "ventana", the Spanish word for "window". They developed a V-3 Hologram System which consists of hardware and software to project holograms without wearables. Their device also includes the ability for users to manipulate the holograms with gestures. The company is headquartered in Van Nuys, California.

Hologram displays
During the 2015 ATP US Open, Mercedes-Benz sponsored a Vntana hologram of tennis player Roger Federer, to which fans could serve tennis balls. The company has also worked with Pepsi on its marketing campaigns. In 2016 Vntana produced the first hologram karaoke device, which was featured on a summer concert tour by Rob Thomas where fans could sing alongside a hologram of Thomas. It also released the holographic selfie device, in which users can produce holograms of themselves, called the Hollagram Selfie Booth, created from a full body scan. Users then received a video of the experience. Lexus has also partnered with Vntana in order to provide holographic representations of its vehicles at sports stadiums, and during Super Bowl LI events, Vntana provided a SpongeBob SquarePants interactive exhibit for children. The Pro Football Hall of Fame uses Vntana life-size holograms of its inductees.

References

2012 establishments in California
Augmented reality
Holography industry
Van Nuys, Los Angeles